Stizophyllum is a genus of flowering plants belonging to the family Bignoniaceae.

Its native range is Southern Mexico to Southern Tropical America.

Species
Species:

Stizophyllum inaequilaterum 
Stizophyllum perforatum 
Stizophyllum riparium

References

Bignoniaceae
Bignoniaceae genera